Paul Charles Miller (born 31 August 1977) is a former New Zealand rugby union player. A number 8, Miller represented Southland and Otago at a provincial level, played for the Highlanders and Chiefs in Super Rugby. He was a member of the New Zealand national side, the All Blacks, in 2001, played two matches but no full internationals. Miller finished his professional career playing in Japan for Kurita Water RFC.

References

1977 births
Living people
People from Gore, New Zealand
New Zealand rugby union players
New Zealand international rugby union players
Southland rugby union players
Otago rugby union players
Highlanders (rugby union) players
Chiefs (rugby union) players
New Zealand expatriate sportspeople in Japan
Expatriate rugby union players in Japan
People educated at King's High School, Dunedin
Rugby union number eights
Rugby union players from Southland, New Zealand